Common Data Format (CDF) is a library and toolkit that was developed by the National Space Science Data Center (NSSDC) at NASA started in 1985. The software is an interface for the storage and manipulation of multi-dimensional data sets.

See also
 CGNS (CFD General Notation System)
 Common data model
 EAS3 (Ein-Ausgabe-System)
 FITS (Flexible Image Transport System)
 GRIB (GRIdded Binary)
 Hierarchical Data Format (HDF)
 NetCDF (Network Common Data Form - not compatible with CDF)
 Tecplot binary files
 XMDF (eXtensible Model Data Format)

References

External links
 
  section 4.2 contains a comparison of CDF, HDF, and netCDF.

Meteorological data and networks
NASA spin-off technologies